Makarenko (also Macarenko) is a Ukrainian surname derived from the given name Makar (Macarius). It may refer to:

 Anton Makarenko (1888–1939) Soviet-Ukrainian educator
 Anton Makarenko (footballer) (born 1988), Ukrainian footballer
 Daria Makarenko (born 1992), Russian footballer
 Evgeny Makarenko (born 1975), Russian boxer
 Gloria Macarenko, Canadian journalist
 Herman Makarenko (born 1961), Ukrainian conductor
 Kristina Makarenko (born 1997), Russian athlete
 Mikhail Makarenko (1931–2007), Soviet dissident
 Sergei Makarenko (born 1937), Soviet-Ukrainian sprint canoeist 
 Yevhenii Makarenko (born 1991), Ukrainian footballer

See also
 
 Makaranka, Belarusian

Ukrainian-language surnames
Surnames of Ukrainian origin